Anaerotruncus  is a bacterial genus from the family of Oscillospiraceae, with one known species (Anaerotruncus colihominis). Anaerotruncus bacteria occur in the human vaginal flora and gut.

References

Further reading 
 
 
 
 

Clostridiaceae
Monotypic bacteria genera
Bacteria genera
Taxa described in 2004